The Guthrie Historic District in Guthrie, Kentucky was listed on the National Register of Historic Places in 2011. It is a  area deemed significant "for its connection with the L&N railroad and its associations with transportation in that area. It included 25 contributing buildings, one contributing structure, and two contributing sites, as well as three non-contributing buildings and six noncontributing sites.

Guthrie was founded as a city in 1879, and railroad service was important to the city.  Commercial service continues, but passenger railroad service ended in 1957.

Buildings in the district include:
Stone House (1898), 106 N. Ewing, a castle-like mansion
Rose House (1820), 112 E. Park, adjacent to Stone House, another large house
Robert Penn Warren Museum, a home of author Robert Penn Warren
Three buildings which, in 2011, were planned to become a railroad museum. In 2022, a railroad museum including a caboose is open by appointment.
Abshire Building (1896), 238 S. Ewing St., a brick building which was once three stories tall, and was a salon and gambling establishment. After a fire destroyed its upper floors in 1899 and Guthrie voting itself "dry", it was renovated into a one-story building.  Its original concrete nameplate of the building, at the top of third floor, was reinstalled above its one story.

References

National Register of Historic Places in Todd County, Kentucky
Buildings and structures completed in 1879
Historic districts on the National Register of Historic Places in Kentucky
Louisville and Nashville Railroad
Transportation in Todd County, Kentucky